Xerocrassa salvanae is a species of air-breathing land snail, a pulmonate gastropod mollusk in the family Geomitridae, the hairy snails and their allies.

Distribution

This species is endemic to Spain.

Taxonomic note
IUCN considers X. salvanae a synonym of Xerotricha madritensis, which is itself a subject of taxonomic ambiguity.

References

 Bank, R. A.; Neubert, E. (2017). Checklist of the land and freshwater Gastropoda of Europe. Last update: July 16th, 2017

salvanae
Molluscs of Europe
Endemic fauna of Spain
Gastropods described in 1886
Taxobox binomials not recognized by IUCN